Anna Maria Tobler (1882–1935) was a Swiss painter.

Notes
This article was initially translated from the German Wikipedia.

20th-century Swiss painters
Swiss women painters
1882 births
1935 deaths
20th-century Swiss women artists